The 1982 Woodpecker Welsh Professional Championship was a professional non-ranking snooker tournament, which took place between 24 and 28 February 1982 at the Ebbw Vale Leisure Centre in Ebbw Vale, Wales.

Doug Mountjoy won the tournament defeating Terry Griffiths 9–8 in the final.

Main draw

References

Welsh Professional Championship
Welsh Professional Championship
Welsh Professional Championship
Welsh Professional Championship